Columbus Air Force Base  is a United States Air Force base located in Columbus, Mississippi. The host unit at Columbus AFB is the 14th Flying Training Wing (14 FTW), which is a part of Air Education and Training Command (AETC).

The residential portion of the base is a census-designated place, with a population of 1,604 at the 2020 census.

Base history
Columbus Air Force Base (AFB) was established in 1941, after the US War Department authorized a pilot training base in Columbus, Mississippi.  It was originally named Kaye Field, after World War I flying ace Samuel Kaye Jr., but confusion with nearby Key Field in Meridian, Mississippi led to it being renamed as Columbus Army Flying School.  The base was deactivated after the end of World War II, but was reactivated four years later with the beginning of the Korean War.

In 1955, Columbus AFB was transferred to Strategic Air Command (SAC) and was occupied by the 4228th Strategic Wing, which later became the 454th Bombardment Wing.  In 1969, Columbus AFB was transferred back to Air Training Command, and was occupied by the 3650th Pilot Training Wing, which became the 14th Flying Training Wing in 1972.

Based units
Flying and notable non-flying units based at Columbus Air Force Base.

Units marked GSU are Geographically Separate Units, which although based at Columbus, are subordinate to a parent unit based at another location.

United States Air Force 
Air Education and Training Command (AETC)

 Nineteenth Air Force
14th Flying Training Wing
14th Comptroller Squadron
14th Operations Group
14th Operations Support Squadron
 14th Student Squadron
 37th Flying Training Squadron – T-6A Texan II
 41st Flying Training Squadron – T-6A Texan II
 43rd Flying Training Squadron
 48th Flying Training Squadron – T-1A Jayhawk
 49th Fighter Training Squadron – T-38C Talon
 50th Flying Training Squadron – T-38C Talon
 14th Mission Support Group
 14th Civil Engineering Squadron
 14th Communications Squadron
 14th Contracting Squadron
 14th Force Support Squadron
 14th Logistics Readiness Squadron
 14th Security Forces Squadron
 14th Medical Group
 14th Medical Operations Squadron
 14th Medical Support Squadron

Air Force Reserve Command (AFRC)

 Tenth Air Force
 340th Flying Training Group
 43rd Flying Training Squadron (GSU) – T-1A Jayhawk, T-6A Texan II

Demographics

Columbus Air Force Base CDP is a census-designated place (CDP) and the official name for an area covering the residential population of the Columbus Air Force Base, in Lowndes County, Mississippi, United States. It was first listed as a CDP in 2008. The population at the 2020 census was 1,604.

2020 census

See also 

 List of United States Air Force installations

References

External links 

 

Airports in Mississippi
Installations of the United States Air Force in Mississippi
Military in Mississippi
Census-designated places in Mississippi
Census-designated places in Lowndes County, Mississippi